3982 Kastelʹ, provisional designation , is a Florian asteroid and a suspected binary system from the inner regions of the asteroid belt, approximately 6.9 kilometers in diameter.

It was discovered on 2 May 1984, by Russian astronomer Lyudmila Karachkina at the Crimean Astrophysical Observatory in Nauchnij on the Crimean peninsula. It is named after Soviet astronomer Galina Kastelʹ.

Classification and orbit 

Kastelʹ is a member of the Flora family, one of the largest families of stony asteroids. It orbits the Sun in the inner main-belt at a distance of 1.8–2.8 AU once every 3 years and 5 months (1,240 days). Its orbit has an eccentricity of 0.22 and an inclination of 5° with respect to the ecliptic.

Physical characteristics 

Kastelʹ has been characterized as a dark and reddish P-type asteroid by the NEOWISE mission of NASA's Wide-field Infrared Survey Explorer, despite measuring an albedo of 0.20. It is also an assumed S-type asteroid.

Diameter and albedo 

According to the survey carried out by NASA's Wide-field Infrared Survey Explorer (WISE) with its subsequent NEOWISE mission, Kastelʹ measures 6.79 kilometers in diameter and its surface has an albedo of 0.201, while Petr Pravec's revised estimates of the thermal WISE observation gave a lower albedo of 0.1695 and consequently a larger diameter of 6.90 kilometers with an absolute magnitude of 13.35.

Lightcurve 

In September 2009 and February 2014, two rotational lightcurves were obtained for this asteroid.

Suspected binary 

During the first of the two a photometric observations – a collaboration between Czech astronomers Petr Pravec, Peter Kušnirák, Leonard Kornoš and Jozef Világi at Ondřejov Observatory, as well as American astronomers Donald Pray, Russel Durkee, Walter R. Cooney Jr., John Gross and Dirk Terrell at several locations in the United States – it was revealed, that Kastelʹ's lightcurve consisted of two linearly additive components, indicative for the presence of an asteroid moon. However, no attenuations were observed, which typically occur when the primary and secondary body are eclipsing each other. After a second observation in 2014, the binary nature of Kastelʹ still remains uncertain. The "Johnstonsarchive" gives no estimates.

Naming 

This minor planet was named in honor of Soviet astronomer Galina Ričardovna Kastelʹ astronomer at the Institute for Theoretical Astronomy (ITA) at Saint Petersburg (then Leningrad). A discoverer of minor planets herself, she is a known expert of the motions of small Solar System bodies and was involved with astrometric work at the discovering observatory. The approved naming citation was published by the Minor Planet Center on 28 May 1991.

Notes

References

External links 
 Asteroids with Satellites, Robert Johnston, johnstonsarchive.net
 Asteroid Lightcurve Database (LCDB), query form (info )
 Dictionary of Minor Planet Names, Google books
 Asteroids and comets rotation curves, CdR – Observatoire de Genève, Raoul Behrend
 Discovery Circumstances: Numbered Minor Planets (1)-(5000) – Minor Planet Center
 
 

Flora asteroids
Kastel'
Kastel'
Binary asteroids
19840502